Lt. General Robert 'Bob' J. Winglass (born October 22, 1935) is an American politician from Maine. From 1957 to 1992, Winglass was a Senior Officer in the United States Marine Corps.  Prior to his retirement, he was Chief of Staff for Installations and Logistics at U.S Marine Corps Headquarters in Washington, D.C., having achieved the rank of Lieutenant General. A Republican, Winglass served in the Maine House of Representatives from 1995 to 1998. He ran unsuccessfully for election in 2010 for District 62 in Auburn and was subsequently appointed Commissioner of Labor in the newly elected Paul LePage administration in June 2011. He resigned as labor commissioner in August 2012.

Winglass was born in Cambridge, Massachusetts and graduated from Springfield College in 1957 with a B.S. in education. He also earned a M.A. in international affairs from George Washington University in 1969. While in the Marine Corps, Winglass was decorated with a Navy Distinguished Service Medal and three Legion of Merit awards. He lived in Bath while serving as Labor Commissioner and, shortly before resigning, sold his Bath home and moved to his retirement home in Surry. He is married to Norma Winglass and they have four children.

Executive director of the Maine AFL-CIO Matt Schlobohm said of Winglass,

We found him to be someone who was very concerned about working people in our state and genuinely worked on important issues. ... We found him to be a voice of reason within an administration and governor who, far too often, has shown contempt for Maine's hard-working people.

References

1935 births
Living people
Politicians from Cambridge, Massachusetts
Politicians from Auburn, Maine
United States Marines
Republican Party members of the Maine House of Representatives
Springfield College (Massachusetts) alumni
Elliott School of International Affairs alumni
LePage Administration cabinet members
People from Bath, Maine
People from Surry, Maine